Haplodrassus signifer is a species of ground spider in the family Gnaphosidae. It is found in North America, Europe, Turkey, Israel, Caucasus, a range from Russia to Central Asia, China, and Korea.

References

External links

 

Gnaphosidae
Articles created by Qbugbot
Spiders described in 1839